Tolisa may refer to the following entities in Bosnia and Herzegovina:

 Tolisa (river)
 Tolisa, Modriča 
 Tolisa, Orašje